The Star Maker is a 1939 American musical film directed by Roy Del Ruth, written by Frank Butler, Don Hartman and Arthur Caesar, and starring Bing Crosby, Louise Campbell, Linda Ware, Ned Sparks, Laura Hope Crews, Janet Waldo and Walter Damrosch. Filming started in Hollywood on April 17, 1939 and was finished in June. The film was released on August 25, 1939, by Paramount Pictures, and had its New York premiere on August 30, 1939. It was the only film in which Crosby played a happily married man.

Plot
Loosely based on the life of vaudevillian Gus Edwards, the film follows the career of aspiring song writer Larry Earl (Crosby) who gives up his job as a night clerk and marries Mary (Louise Campbell). He is anxious to get his songs published and buys a piano which they can ill afford. He sees children performing in the street and has an idea to develop and produce their talent on stage. Initially he cannot obtain any bookings but Mary persuades an agent to give her husband a chance. The one night try-out is a success and he forms "Larry Earl Kiddie Productions" which in due course has 14 productions running in various towns. Larry Earl opens a Broadway musical called School Days, the crowning point of his career, but halfway through the first performance it is closed down by the Children's Welfare Society as they will not allow children under 12 years of age to work past 10 p.m. All of Earl's productions have to be closed down too. Earl had developed the career of Jane Gray (Linda Ware) and he transfers her contract to Walter Damrosch and she performs for him at Carnegie Hall. Later Earl realizes that he can still use children on radio and the film closes with him singing with a children's chorus on a radio show.

Cast

Bing Crosby as Larry Earl
Louise Campbell as Mary
Linda Ware as Jane Gray
Ned Sparks as 'Speed' King
Laura Hope Crews as Carlotta Salvini
Janet Waldo as Stella
Walter Damrosch as Walter Damrosch
Thurston Hall as Mr. Proctor
Clara Blandick as Miss Esther Jones
Oscar O'Shea as Mr. Flannigan
John Gallaudet as Duke
Ben Welden as Joe Gimlick
Emory Parnell as Mr. Olson
Dorothy Vaughan as Mrs. Riley
Bodil Rosing as Mrs. Swanson
Paul Stanton as Mr. Coyle
Morgan Wallace as Lou Morris
Richard Denning as Assistant Dance Director
Joseph Crehan as Old Gentleman
Ethel Griffies as Voice Teacher
Frank Faylen as First Reporter
Billy Gilbert as Steel Worker
Grace Hayle as Rural Mother
Johnnie Morris as Newsboy 
Selmer Jackson as Doctor
Sig Arno as Ballet Master 
Ralph Faulkner as Fencing Master
Earl Dwire as Mac, the Accountant
Harry C. Bradley as Conductor 
Wally Maher as Reporter
George Eldredge as Reporter
Stanley Price as Reporter
George Guhl as Piano Mover
Jimmie Dundee as Second Piano Mover 
Max Wagner as Third Piano Mover
Ralph Sanford as Uniformed Doorman
A.S. 'Pop' Byron as Stage Doorman
Allen Fox as Photographer
Fritzi Brunette as Cutie's Mother
Edwin Stanley as Gerry Member 
Ottola Nesmith as Elderly Lady
Jack Pennick as Prizefighter
George C. Pearce as Gerry Society Member 
Doro Merande as Gerry Society Woman
Frances Raymond as Gerry Society Woman 
Kenneth Wilson as Ken 
Billy Simms as Spike
Donald Brenon as Judge
Patti McCarty as Patsy 
John Andrews as Andy
Danny Daniels as Blackie
Don Hulbert as Duck
Gloria Atherton as Curly
Darryl Hickman as Boots
Dorothy Babb as Dottie
Dante DiPaolo as Turkey 
Tommy Batten as Bats
Mary Ellen Bergren as Ivories
Gene Collins as Dummy
Eugene Eberle as Whitey
Dolores Dianne as Rusty
Joe Geil as Red
Richard Humphries as Chicago
Jackie McGee as Lucky 
Joyce Arleen as Toots
Roland Dupree as Frenchy
Marilyn Marlin as Ginger
Patsy Parsons as Cookie 
Jean Ruth as Butch
Leon Tyler as Big Ears
Howard Smiley as Skipper
Marilyn McKay as Cutie
Dena Penn as Penny

Soundtrack
 "Jimmy Valentine" (Edward Madden / Gus Edwards) sung by Bing Crosby.
 "A Man and His Dream" (James V. Monaco. Johnny Burke) sung by Bing Crosby.
 "If I Was a Millionaire" (Will D. Cobb / Gus Edwards) sung by Bing Crosby and children.
 "Go Fly a Kite" (James V. Monaco / Johnny Burke) sung by Bing Crosby and children.
 "I Wonder Who's Kissing Her Now" sung by Bing Crosby.
 "Sunbonnet Sue" (Will D. Cobb / Gus Edwards) sung by children
 "In My Merry Oldsmobile" sung by Bing Crosby and children.
 "Darktown Strutters' Ball" sung by Linda Ware
 "An Apple for the Teacher" sung by Linda Ware, Bing Crosby and children.
 "School Days" sung by Linda Ware, Bing Crosby and children.
 "Waltz of the Flowers" sung by Linda Ware
 "Still the Bluebird Sings" (James V. Monaco / Johnny Burke) sung by Bing Crosby and children.

Bing Crosby recorded a number of the songs for Decca Records. "An Apple for the Teacher" (recorded with Connee Boswell) was a huge hit reaching the No. 2 position in the charts. "Go Fly a Kite" and "A Man and His Dream" also reached the top 10. Crosby's songs were also included in the Bing's Hollywood series.

Reception
Frank S. Nugent of The New York Times was not impressed. The Star Maker,' the new Bing Crosby film at the Paramount, was inspired (to employ a euphemism) by the career of Gus Edwards, a show-minded Pied Piper who used to swing around the old vaudeville circuits followed by precocious little song and dance teams — the girls in sunbonnets, the boys in newsies' tatters — who grew up, or at least some of them did, to become Walter Winchell, George Jessel, Eddie Cantor and Mervyn LeRoy...There isn't much more to the picture. Mr. Crosby sings in his usual lullaby manner and hasn't many good lines to play with. Ned Sparks sneaks away with a comic scene or two as the child-hating press agent who has to tell bedtime stories and spins a grim whopper about the mean old wolf who gobbled up the little kiddies... But it is all, if Mr. Edwards will pardon us, too much like a Gus Edwards revue and far too much of that."
 
Variety was far more positive. "Film is first-class entertainment, a lively combination of the conventional backstage story, which is played for comedy angles, and filmusical technique, that is up to best standards...Audiences will quickly and cheerfully respond to the gayety [sic] which pervades the film. ... It's the Gus Edwards repertoire of pop tunes which gives the film zest and the feeling that yesterday is worth remembering. 'School Days' is recreated in an elaborate production number, including an interpolation when Crosby, speaking directly from the screen to the film audience, invites and obtains a spirited if somewhat vocally uncertain choral participation."

References

External links
 
 

1939 films
American black-and-white films
1930s English-language films
Films directed by Roy Del Ruth
Films scored by Alfred Newman
Paramount Pictures films
American musical films
1939 musical films
1930s American films